Lazar Moiseyevich Kaganovich, also Kahanovich (– 25 July 1991), was a Soviet politician and administrator, and one of the main associates of Joseph Stalin. He was one of several associates who helped Stalin to seize power.

Born to Jewish parents in modern Ukraine (then part of the Russian Empire) in 1893, Kaganovich was the son of Moisei Benovich Kaganovich (1863–1923) and Genya Iosifovna Dubinskaya (1860–1933). Of the 13 children born to the family, 6 died in infancy. Lazar had four elder brothers, all of whom became members of the Bolshevik party. Several of Lazar's brothers ended up occupying positions of varying significance in the Soviet government. Mikhail Kaganovich (1888–1941) served as People's Commissar of Defence Industry before being appointed Head of the People's Commissariat of the Aviation Industry of the USSR, while Yuli Kaganovich (1892–1962) became the 3rd First Secretary of the Gorky Regional Committee of the CPSU. Israel Kaganovich (1884–1973) was made the head of the Main Directorate for Cattle Harvesting of the Ministry of Meat and Dairy Industry. However, Aron Moiseevich Kaganovich (1888–1960s) apparently decided against following his siblings into government, and did not pursue a career in politics. Lazar also had a sister, Rachel Moiseevna Kaganovich (1883–1926), who married Mordechai Ber Lantzman; they lived together in Chernobyl for a period, but she subsequently died in the 1920s and was interred in Kiev. 

Kaganovich worked as a shoemaker and became a member of the Bolsheviks, joining the party around 1911. As an organizer, Kaganovich was active in Yuzovka (Donetsk), Saratov and Belarus throughout the 1910s, and led a revolt in Belarus during the 1917 October Revolution. In the early 1920s, he helped consolidate Soviet rule in Turkestan. In 1922, Stalin placed Kaganovich in charge of organizational work within the Communist Party, through which he helped Stalin consolidate his grip of the party bureaucracy. Kaganovich rose quickly through the ranks, becoming a full member of the Central Committee in 1924, First Secretary of the Communist Party of Ukraine in 1925, and Secretary of the Central Committee as well as a member of the Politburo in 1930.
From the mid-1930s onwards, Kaganovich served as people's commissar for Railways, Heavy Industry and Oil Industry.

During the Second World War, Kaganovich was commissar of the North Caucasian and Transcaucasian Fronts. After the war, apart from serving in various industrial posts, Kaganovich was also made deputy head of the Soviet government. After Stalin's death in 1953 he quickly lost influence. Following an unsuccessful coup attempt against Nikita Khrushchev in 1957, Kaganovich was forced to retire from the Presidium and the Central Committee. In 1961 he was expelled from the party, and lived out his life as a pensioner in Moscow. At his death in 1991, he was the last surviving Old Bolshevik. The Soviet Union itself outlasted him by only five months, dissolving on 26 December 1991.

Early life
Kaganovich was born in 1893 to Jewish parents
in the village of Kabany, Radomyshl uyezd, Kiev Governorate, Russian Empire (today Dibrova, Kyiv Oblast, Ukraine). Although not from a "fanatically observant" family, according to Kaganovich, he spoke Yiddish at home.

Around 1911, he joined the Bolshevik party (his older brother Mikhail Kaganovich had become a member in 1905). Early in his political career, in 1915, Kaganovich became a Communist organizer at a shoe factory where he worked. During the same year he was arrested and sent back to Kabany.

Revolution and Civil War
During March and April 1917, he served as the Chairman of the Tanners Union and as the vice-chairman of the Yuzovka Soviet. In May 1917, he became the leader of the military organization of Bolsheviks in Saratov, and in August 1917, he became the leader of the Polessky Committee of the Bolshevik party in Belarus. During the October Revolution of 1917 he led the revolt in Gomel.

In 1918 Kaganovich acted as Commissar of the propaganda department of the Red Army. From May 1918 to August 1919 he was the Chairman of the Ispolkom (Committee) of the Nizhny Novgorod Governorate. In 1919–1920, he served as governor of the Voronezh Governorate. The years 1920 to 1922 he spent in Turkmenistan as one of the leaders of the Bolshevik struggle against local Muslim rebels (basmachi), and also commanding the succeeding punitive expeditions against local opposition.

Communist functionary
In May 1922, Stalin became the General Secretary of the Communist Party and immediately transferred Kaganovich to his apparatus to head the Organizational Bureau or Orgburo of the Secretariat. This department was responsible for all assignments within the apparatus of the Communist Party. Working there, Kaganovich helped to place Stalin's supporters in important jobs within the Communist Party bureaucracy. In this position he became noted for his great work capacity and for his personal loyalty to Stalin. He stated publicly that he would execute absolutely any order from Stalin, which at that time was a novelty.

In 1924, Kaganovich became a full member of the Central Committee, after having first been elected as a candidate one year earlier. From 1925 to 1928, Kaganovich was the First Secretary of the Communist Party of the Ukrainian SSR. He was given the task of "ukrainizatsiya" – meaning at that time the building up of Ukrainian communist popular cadres. He also had the duty of implementing collectivization and the policy of economic suppression of the kulaks (wealthier peasants). He opposed the more moderate policy of Nikolai Bukharin, who argued in favor of the "peaceful integration of kulaks into socialism." In 1928, due to numerous protests against Kaganovich's management, Stalin was forced to transfer Kaganovich from Ukraine to Moscow, where he returned to his position as a Secretary of the Central Committee of the Communist Party, a job he held until 1939. As Secretary, he endorsed Stalin's struggle against the so-called Left and Right Oppositions within the Communist Party, in the hope that Stalin would become the sole leader of the country. In 1933 and 1934, he served as the Chairman of the Commission for Vetting of the Party Membership (Tsentralnaya komissiya po proverke partiynykh ryadov) and ensured personally that nobody associated with anti-Stalin opposition would be permitted to remain a Communist Party member. In 1934, at the XVII Congress of the Communist Party, Kaganovich chaired the Counting Committee. He falsified voting for positions in the Central Committee, deleting 290 votes opposing the Stalin candidacy. His actions resulted in Stalin's being re-elected as the General Secretary instead of Sergey Kirov. By the rules, the candidate receiving fewer opposing votes should become the General Secretary. Before Kaganovich's falsification, Stalin received 292 opposing votes and Kirov only three. However, the "official" result (due to the interference of Kaganovich) saw Stalin with just two opposing votes.

In 1930, Kaganovich became a member of the Soviet Politburo and the First Secretary of the Moscow Obkom of the Communist Party (1930–1935). He later headed the Moscow Gorkom of the Communist Party (1931–1934). 
He also supervised implementation of many of Stalin's economic policies, including the collectivization of agriculture and rapid industrialization. During this period, he also supervised destruction of many of the city's oldest monuments, including the Cathedral of Christ the Saviour.
In 1932, he led the suppression of the workers' strike in Ivanovo-Voznesensk.

Moscow Metro 
On June 15, 1931, at the Plenum of the Central Committee of the All-Union Communist Party (Bolsheviks), after a report by the first secretary of the Moscow City Party Committee, Lazar Kaganovich, a decision was made to build the Moscow metro to improve the transport situation in the city and partially relieve tram lines.

In the 1930s, Kaganovich – along with project managers Ivan Kuznetsov and, later Isaac Segal – organized and led the building of the first Soviet underground rapid-transport system, the Moscow Metro, known as Metropoliten imeni L.M. Kaganovicha after him until 1955.

On October 15, 1941, L. M. Kaganovich received an order to close the Moscow Metro, and within three hours to prepare proposals for its destruction, as a strategically important object. The metro was supposed to be destroyed, and the remaining cars and equipment removed. On the morning of October 16, 1941, on the day of the panic in Moscow, the metro was not opened for the first time. It was the only day in the history of the Moscow metro when it did not work. By evening, the order to destroy the metro was canceled.

In 1955, after the death of Stalin, the Moscow Metro was renamed to no longer include Kaganovich's name.

Responsibility for the 1932 - 1933 famine

Kaganovich (together with Vyacheslav Molotov) participated with the All-Ukrainian Party Conference of 1930 and were given the task of implementation of the collectivization policy that influenced the 1932–33 famine (known as the Holodomor in Ukraine). Similar policies also inflicted enormous suffering on the Soviet Central Asian republic of Kazakhstan, the Kuban region, Crimea, the lower Volga region, and other parts of the Soviet Union. As an emissary of the Central Committee of the Communist Party, Kaganovich traveled to Ukraine, the central regions of the USSR, the Northern Caucasus, and Siberia demanding the acceleration of collectivization and repressions against the Kulaks, who were generally blamed for the slow progress of collectivization.
Attorney and 'father of the UN Genocide Convention' Rafael Lemkin in his work Soviet Genocide in the Ukraine described the Holodomor as a genocide of a totalitarian regime.

On 13 January 2010, Kyiv Appellate Court posthumously found Kaganovich, Postyshev, Kosior, Chubar and other Soviet Communist Party functionaries guilty of genocide against Ukrainians during the catastrophic Holodomor famine. Though they were pronounced guilty as criminals, the case was ended immediately according to paragraph 8 of Article 6 of the Criminal Procedural Code of Ukraine. By New Year's Day, the Security Service of Ukraine had finished pre-court investigation and transferred its materials to the Prosecutor General of Ukraine. The materials consist of over 250 volumes of archive documents (from within Ukraine as well as from abroad), interviews with witnesses, and expert analysis of several institutes of National Academies of Sciences. Oleksandr Medvedko, the Prosecutor General, stated that the material proves that a genocide occurred in Ukraine.

"Iron Lazar"

From 1935 to 1937, Kaganovich worked as Narkom (Minister) for the railways. Even before the start of the Great Purges, he organized the arrests of thousands of railway administrators and managers accused of sabotage.

From 1937 to 1939, Kaganovich served as Narkom for Heavy Industry. During 1939–1940, he served as Narkom for the Oil Industry. 
Each of his assignments was associated with arrests in order to improve discipline and compliance with Stalin's policies.

In all Party conferences of the later 1930s, he made speeches demanding increased efforts in the search for and prosecution of "foreign spies" and "saboteurs." For his ruthlessness in the execution of Stalin's orders, he was nicknamed "Iron Lazar." During the period of the Great Terror, starting in 1936, Kaganovich's signature appears on 188 out of 357 documented execution lists.

One of many who perished during these years was Lazar's brother, Mikhail Kaganovich, who was People's Commissar of the Aviation Industry. On 10 January 1940 Mikhail was demoted to director of aviation plant 124 in Kazan. In February 1941, during the 18th Conference of the Communist Party, Mikhail was warned that if the plant missed its quotas he would be eliminated from the Party. On 1 June 1941 Stalin mentioned to Lazar that he had heard that Mikhail was "associating with the right wing." Lazar reportedly did not speak in the defence of his brother to Stalin, but did notify him by telephone. The same day Mikhail committed suicide.

During his time serving as Railways Commissar, Kaganovich participated in the murder of 36,000 people by signing death lists. Kaganovich had exterminated so many railwaymen that one official called to warn that one line was entirely unmanned.

During World War II (known as the Great Patriotic War in the USSR), Kaganovich was Commissar (Member of the Military Council) of the North Caucasian and Transcaucasian Fronts. During 1943–1944, he was again the Narkom for the railways. In 1943, he was presented with the title of Hero of Socialist Labour. From 1944 to 1947, Kaganovich was the Minister for Building Materials.

In 1947, he became the First Secretary of the Ukrainian Communist Party. From 1948 to 1952, he served as the Chairman of Gossnab (State Committee for Material-Technical Supply, charged with the primary responsibility for the allocation of producer goods to enterprises, a critical state function in the absence of markets), and from 1952 to 1957, as the First Vice-Premier of the Council of Ministers. He was also the first Chairman of Goskomtrud (State Committee for Labour and Wages, charged with introducing the minimum wage, with other wage policy, and with improving the old-age pension system).

Until 1957, Kaganovich was a voting member of the Politburo as well as the Presidium. He was also an early mentor of the eventual First Secretary of the Communist Party Nikita Khrushchev, who first became important as Kaganovich's Moscow City deputy during the 1930s. In 1947, when Khrushchev was dismissed as the Party secretary of Ukraine (he remained in the somewhat lesser "chief of government" position), Stalin dispatched Kaganovich to replace him until Khrushchev was reinstated later that year.

Later life

Kaganovich was a doctrinaire Stalinist, and though he remained a member of the Presidium, he quickly lost influence after Stalin's death in March 1953. In 1957, along with fellow devoted Stalinists as well as other opponents of Khrushchev: Molotov, Dmitri Shepilov and Georgy Malenkov (the so-called Anti-Party Group), he participated in an abortive party coup against his former protégé Khrushchev, whose criticism of Stalin had become increasingly harsh during the preceding two years. As a result of the unsuccessful coup, Kaganovich was forced to retire from the Presidium and the Central Committee, and was given the job of director of a small potash works in the Urals. In 1961, Kaganovich was completely expelled from the Party and became a pensioner living in Moscow. His grandchildren reported that after his dismissal from the Central Committee, Kaganovich (who had a reputation for his temperamental and allegedly violent nature) never again shouted and became a devoted grandfather.

In 1984, his re-admission to the Party was considered by the Politburo, alongside that of Molotov. During the last years of life he played dominoes with fellow pensioners and criticized Soviet media attacks on Stalin with words: "First, Stalin is disowned, now, little by little, it gets to prosecute socialism, the October Revolution, and in no time they will also want to prosecute Lenin and Marx." Shortly before death he suffered a heart attack.

In 1991, Lazar Kaganovich, was interviewed about the alleged poisoning of Lenin’s widow, Nadezhda Krupskaya, in which he suggested Lavrentiy Beria may have been involved with Krupskaya’s poisoning and was quoted in 1991 as saying “I can’t dismiss that possibility. He might have.” Russian writer, Arkady Vaksberg, further commented that the fact Kagnanovich had confirmed the poisoning “did actually take place is more important than specifying who ordered it.”

Kaganovich died on July 25, 1991, at the age of 97, just before the events that resulted in the end of the USSR. He is buried at the Novodevichy Cemetery in Moscow.

The Wolf of the Kremlin 

In 1987, American journalist Stuart Kahan published a book entitled The Wolf of the Kremlin: The First Biography of L.M. Kaganovich, the Soviet Union's Architect of Fear (William Morrow & Co). In the book, Kahan made a series of claims about Kaganovich's working relationship with Stalin and his activities during the Ukrainian famine, and claimed to be Kaganovich's long-lost nephew. He also claimed to have interviewed Kaganovich personally and stated that Kaganovich admitted to being partially responsible for the death of Stalin in 1953 (supposedly by poisoning). A number of other unusual claims were made as well, including that Stalin was married to a sister of Kaganovich (supposedly named "Rosa") during the last year of his life and that Kaganovich (who was raised Jewish) was the architect of anti-Jewish pogroms.

After The Wolf of the Kremlin was translated into Russian by Progress Publishers, and a chapter from it printed in the Nedelya (Week) newspaper in 1991, remaining members of Kaganovich's family composed the Statement of the Kaganovich Family in response. The statement disputed all of Kahan's claims.

Rosa Kaganovich, who said that the Statement of the Kaganovich Family was fabricated, was referred to as Stalin's wife in the 1940s and 1950s by Western media including The New York Times, Time and Life. The story of Rosa Kaganovich was mentioned by Trotsky, who alleged that "Stalin married the sister of Kaganovich, thereby presenting the latter with hopes for a promising future."

Personal life
Kaganovich entered the workforce at the age of 13, an event which would shape his aesthetics and preferences through adulthood. Stalin himself confided to Kaganovich that the latter had a much greater fondness and appreciation for the proletariat. As his favorability with Stalin rose, Kaganovich felt compelled to rapidly fill the noticeable gaps in his education and upbringing. Stalin, upon noticing that Kaganovich could not use commas properly, gave Kaganovich three months' leave to undertake a blitz course in grammar. 

Kaganovich was married to Maria Markovna Kaganovich (née Privorotskaya) (1894–1961), a fellow assimilated Kievan Jew who was part of the revolutionary effort since 1909. Mrs. Kaganovich spent many years as a powerful municipal official, directly ordering the demolition of the Iberian Gate and Chapel and Cathedral of Christ the Saviour. The couple had two children: a daughter, named Maya, and an adopted son, Yuri. Much attention has been devoted by historians to Kaganovich's Jewishness, and how it conflicted with Stalin's biases. Kaganovich frequently found it necessary to allow great cruelties to occur to his family to preserve Stalin's trust in him, such as allowing his brother to be coerced into suicide.

The Kaganovich family initially lived, as most high-level Soviet functionaries in the 1930s, a conservative lifestyle in modest conditions. This changed when Stalin entrusted the construction of the Moscow Metro to Kaganovich. The family moved into a luxurious apartment near ground zero (Sokolniki station), located at 3 Pesochniy Pereulok (Sandy Lane). Kaganovich's apartment consisted of two floors (an extreme rarity in the USSR), a private access garage, and a designated space for butlers, security, and drivers.

Decorations and awards
Order of Lenin, four times
Order of the Red Banner of Labour (27 October, 1938)
Hero of Socialist Labour (5 November, 1943)

References

Further reading

 
 Fitzpatrick, S. (1996). Stalin's Peasants: Resistance and Survival in the Russian Village after Collectivization. New York: Oxford University Press.
——. (1999). Everyday Stalinism: Ordinary Life in Extraordinary Times: Soviet Russia in the 1930s. New York: Oxford University Press.
 Kotkin, S. (2017). Stalin: Waiting for Hitler, 1929-1941. New York: Random House.
 Radzinsky, Edvard, (1996) Stalin, Doubleday (English translation edition), 1996. 
Rees, E.A. Iron Lazar: A Political Biography of Lazar Kaganovich (Anthem Press; 2012) 373 pages; scholarly biography 
Rubenstein, Joshua, The Last Days of Stalin, (Yale University Press: 2016)

External links

Profile at http://www.hrono.ru 
 
 

1893 births
1991 deaths
Stalinism
Anti-revisionists
Burials at Novodevichy Cemetery
Expelled members of the Communist Party of the Soviet Union
First convocation members of the Verkhovna Rada of the Ukrainian Soviet Socialist Republic
First Secretaries of the Communist Party of Ukraine (Soviet Union)
Genocide perpetrators
Great Purge perpetrators
Heroes of Socialist Labour
Holodomor
Jewish socialists
Jewish Soviet politicians
Old Bolsheviks
People from Kiev Governorate
People from Kyiv Oblast
People's Commissariat of Heavy Industry
People's commissars and ministers of the Soviet Union
Politburo of the Central Committee of the Communist Party of the Soviet Union members
Recipients of the Order of Lenin
Recipients of the Order of the Red Banner of Labour
Russian Social Democratic Labour Party members
Soviet people of World War II
Ukrainian communists